James Jongeneel (May 30, 1922 – January 12, 2010) was an American field hockey player. He competed in the men's tournament at the 1956 Summer Olympics.

References

External links
 

1922 births
2010 deaths
American male field hockey players
Olympic field hockey players of the United States
Field hockey players at the 1956 Summer Olympics
People from Bogor